Dom António José Cavaco Carrilho GOIH (Loulé, April 11, 1942) who identifies himself as António Carrilho and is officially António III, is a Portuguese prelate of the Catholic Church who was Bishop of Funchal between 2007 and January 2018.

Early life and education 
António Carrilho was born in Loulé, in Algarve, Alexandre Bento Carrilho and de Isabel de Jesus Cavaco.

He joined the Faro Seminary in October 1953, and then moved to Lisbon to pursue philosophical and theological courses at the Olivais Seminary.

In October 1977 he joined the Catholic University in Lisbon, where he graduated with a degree in theology.

Priesthood 
On July 28, 1965, he was ordained priest by Bishop Fra Francisco Rendeiro at the Cathedral of Faro. He celebrated his New Mass in the Mother Church of his parish of St. Clement in Loulé.

After graduating from university he began to work at the Portuguese Episcopal Conference, where he held various functions over the years.

Episcopate 
On 22 February 1999, he was appointed Titular Bishop of Tamalluma and Auxiliary Bishop Porto by Pope John Paul II. On 8 March 2007 he was appointed Bishop of Funchal, a post he held until his successor was appointed by Pope Francis on January 12, 2019.

Portugal's Conference of Catholic Bishops 
Bishop Carrilho has held several posts within Portugal's Conference of Catholic Bishops over the years:

 Member of the Episcopal Commission of the Apostolate of the Laity for the 1999-2002 triennium and President for 2002/2005
 Member of the Episcopal Commission of Cultural Assets of the Church for the triennium 2002/2005
 President of the Episcopal Commission of the Laity and Family for two three-year periods, 2005-2011, and member since 2011

Currently he is a member the Conference's Commission for Missions and New Evangelization.

Priest Giselo Andrade Case 
In November 2017, Madeiran newspapers reported that Priest Giselo Andrade, canon of the Catholic parish of Monte in Funchal, then 37 years old, had assumed the paternity of a girl on August 18 of the same year. The girl was born to a former high school colleague of the priest.

At the time of the news reports Father Giselo was a member of the Permanent Secretariat of the Presbyteral Council and the director of the Diocese's newspaper Jornal da Madeira.

Carilho was forced to intervene after he had commented to the press that "Everything is forgiven, as long as there is true repenting and a change in lifestyle" to justify the permanence in office of Priest Giselo and his wish to remain in functions within the parish.

On January 27, at 9 o'clock in the evening, Bishop Carrilho stated, through his personal secretary, Priest Carlos Almada, in a press release, that Priest Giselo was to be removed from office in the parish of Monte and to be substituted by the canon Vítor Gomes. Despite being the removed from the parish, Bishop Carrilho stated in his press release that Father Giselo would to "...continue to exercise the pastoral ministry through some of the activities already entrusted to him in the area of communications [as director of Jornal da Madeira], and others that may be assigned to him".Bishop Carillho's decision and its timing polarized the public opinion in Madeira, specially in Monte where the vast majority of parishioners wished that Priest Giselo remain as their priest even after he had assumed the paternity of the child. Parishioners criticized and repudiated Bishop Carrilho's decision, calling it an inhumane decision.

Sexual Abuse Policies 
In September 2018, Carilho decided to remove from office Father Anastácio Alves, who had ecclesiastical functions on the Portuguese Parish of Gentilly, near Paris, after Madeira's Public Prosecution Service announced investigations on an alleged child abuse case. Bishop Carrilho stated that the Diocese of Funchal has zero tolerance policy regarding child abuse cases and is in "full communion with Pope Francis's" views on how to handle the said cases. In light of this case, Bishop Carrilho also stated that he would be conducting an investigation on Father Alves's case and submit all the conclusions to the Congregation for the Doctrine of the Faith, as required by Canon law.

Public Support for Pope Francis 
Following the McCarrick case and Viganò allegations, happening at about the same time as the conclusion of the Grand jury investigation of Catholic Church sexual abuse in Pennsylvania, Bishop Carrilho, together with his peers of the Portuguese Episcopal Conference was co-signer of a public support letter addressed to Pope Francis.

The Portuguese bishops criticized all "attempts to call into question the [Pope's] credibility" and expressed "fraternal support" to the leader of the Catholic Church, stressing that they are in "full communion" with the Pope.

In the same letter, Bishop Carrilho and his peers also took the opportunity to support and condemn the "drama of child abuse by responsible members of the Church," under a commitment to "root out the causes."

Honours 

  Grand Officer of the Order of Prince Henry, 2019

Coat of Arms

References 

21st-century Roman Catholic bishops in Portugal
1942 births
Living people
People from Loulé